FCPS may refer to:

Education 
 Facultad de Ciencias Políticas y Sociales, faculty of political and social sciences at the National Autonomous University of Mexico
 Fairfax County Public Schools, in Virginia, United States
 Fairfield College Preparatory School, in Connecticut, United States
 Fayette County Public Schools (disambiguation)
 Frederick County Public Schools (disambiguation)

Other uses 
 Fellow of the Cambridge Philosophical Society
 Fellow of  College of Physicians and Surgeons, a fellowship offered by Bangladesh College of Physicians and Surgeons
 Fellow of College of Physicians and Surgeons Pakistan (also called FCPS), a fellowship offered by the College of Physicians and Surgeons Pakistan
 Fort Collins Police Services, in Colorado, United States

See also 
 FCP (disambiguation)